San Juan y Martínez is a municipality and town in the Pinar del Río Province of Cuba.

Overview
Its economy is centered mainly on agriculture and the crop of its farmers, the largest of which being tobacco. In Cuba, San Juan y Martinez is known as the "Mecca of the Tobacco."

San Juan has its own hospital with a fully functional maternity ward as well as a "Polyclinic" treatment center, both open 24 hours.

Demographics
In 2004, the municipality of San Juan y Martínez had a population of 45,061.

See also
Municipalities of Cuba
List of cities in Cuba
San Juan y Martínez Municipal Museum

References

External links

Populated places in Pinar del Río Province